Thomas Charles Milnes (March 11, 1870 – April 30, 1954) was a Canadian provincial politician from Alberta. He served as a member of the Legislative Assembly of Alberta from 1921 to 1925 sitting as an Independent and as Mayor of Claresholm from 1910 to 1911.

Early life
Thomas Charles Milnes was born March 11, 1870, in Columbus, Indiana, to Thomas Milnes and Lousia Milnes. Milnes was educat4ed in Columbus and married Emma McCleary on June 8, 1898, and together had four children. He moved to Canada later in 1905 to become a farmer and rancher.

Milnes constructed a two-storey Edwardian Commercial building in Claresholm known as Milnes Block in 1910. The building was designated a Provincial Historic Resource by the Government of Alberta on May 30, 2002.

Political career
Milnes was elected Mayor of Claresholm, Alberta from 1910 to 1911.

Milnes ran for a seat to the Alberta Legislature as an Independent Farmer candidate in the 1921 Alberta general election. He defeated incumbent Louise McKinney in a hotly contested election to win the Claresholm electoral district.

Milnes resigned his seat on October 30, 1925, to run as a candidate in the 1925 Canadian federal election. He ran as a federal Liberal candidate in the electoral district of Macleod. Milnes finished a distant third place in the three way race losing to George Coote and runner of John Herron.

Later life
Milnes died at the Holy cross Hospital in Calgary on April 30, 1954, at the age of 84.

References

External links
Legislative Assembly of Alberta Members Listing

Independent Alberta MLAs
Candidates in the 1925 Canadian federal election
1954 deaths
1870 births
Liberal Party of Canada candidates for the Canadian House of Commons
Mayors of places in Alberta